

Anton Giulio Bragaglia (11 February 1890 – 15 July 1960) was a pioneer in Italian Futurist photography and Futurist cinema. A versatile and intellectual artist with wide interests, he wrote about film, theatre, and dance.

Early life
Bragaglia was born in Frosinone, Lazio. His brothers were actor Arturo Bragaglia and film director Carlo Ludovico Bragaglia. In 1906 Bragaglia went to work as an assistant director of a Roman movie studio managed by his father Francesco. He gained a great deal of technical and artistic experience there, learning from directors Mario Caserini and Enrico Guazzoni. His younger siblings Arturo (actor) and Carlo Ludovico (film director) were both involved in Italian cinema from the 1930s to mid-1960s.

Futurism
In 1911 he published the treatise Fotodinamismo and began lecturing on the concept. In the same year he became the chief editor of the art and theater newspaper "L'Artista". He published two Futurist manifestos,  Fotodinamica Futurista (1912) and Manifesto of Futurist Cinema (1916). In 1916 he founded the avant garde magazine Cronache di Attualità, which examined politics, music, theater and art from a Futurist standpoint. In the same year he founded the film studio "Novissima-Film", and produced some visionary Futurist films including Thais, Perfido incanto, and Il mio cadavere.

In 1918 he opened an art gallery, the "Casa d'Arte Bragaglia", which became a nexus of avant garde artists and exhibitions. It displayed the work of such modernists as Balla, Depero, De Chirico, Boccioni, Klimt and Kandinsky. In 1919 he directed plays by Rosso di San Secondo and Pirandello.

From 1921 to 1924 Bragaglia published the satirical pamphlet Index Rerum Virorumque Prohibitorum ("Index of Forbidden Things and Men"). In 1922 he opened the "Teatro Sperimentale degli Indipendenti" which he directed till 1936. The same year he founded his own theater company ("Company Bragaglia Shows"), which also became a focal point for the Italian avant garde. In 1932, he was named advisor to the Corporazione dello Spettacolo (Entertainment Guild). The Teatro closed in 1936, and from 1937 to 1943 he was director of the foundation "Teatro delle Arti".

Bragaglia described his theories on the theater in Maschera mobile (1926), Del teatro teatrale ossia del teatro  (1927), and Il segreto di Tabarrino (1933). He directed more than fifty productions. From 1926 until 1960, he also wrote a number of articles and books about art, the theater and motion pictures.

Bragaglia died in Rome on 15 July 1960.

Selected filmography
Thais (1917) 	
Il mio cadavere (1917)
Perfido incanto (1918)
Un dramma nell'Olimpo (1917)
Vele ammainate (1931)
 Lowered Sails (1931)

Bibliography 
 Giovanni Lista, Futurismo e fotografia, Edizioni Multhipla, Milan, 1979.
 Photographie futuriste italienne (1911–1939), exposition organisée par Giovanni Lista, Musée d’Art Moderne, 29 October 1981 – 3 January 1982, Paris.
 Giovanni Lista, Futurism and Photography, Merrell Publishers, Londres, 2001.
 Giovanni Lista, Cinéma et photographie futuriste, Skira-Flammarion Éditeur, Paris, 2008.
 Il Futurismo nella fotografia, exposition organisée par Giovanni Lista, Museo Nazionale Alinari della Fotografia, 17 September-15 November 2009, Florence – Edizioni Alinari, Florence, 2009.

Notes and references
This article comes largely from Anton Giulio Bragaglia article on the Italian Wikipedia.

External links

1890 births
1960 deaths
People from Frosinone
Italian photographers
Italian film directors
Italian theatre directors
Italian magazine publishers (people)
Futurist filmmakers
Futurist photographers
Italian Futurism